Oreste Moricca (5 August 1891 – 21 June 1984) was an Italian fencer. He won a gold and bronze medal at the 1924 Summer Olympics.

See also
Moricca

References

External links
 

1891 births
1984 deaths
Italian male fencers
Olympic fencers of Italy
Fencers at the 1924 Summer Olympics
Olympic gold medalists for Italy
Olympic bronze medalists for Italy
Olympic medalists in fencing
Sportspeople from the Province of Vibo Valentia
Medalists at the 1924 Summer Olympics
20th-century Italian people